The 2019 Dallas Rattlers season was the seventeenth season for the Rattlers franchise of Major League Lacrosse, and second season playing in Frisco, Texas since relocating from Rochester, New York.

The Rattlers finished a league-best 11-3 in 2018, but fell short to the Denver Outlaws in the 2018 Steinfeld Cup, 16-12 in Charleston, South Carolina. It was the Rattlers' second loss in five years to the Outlaws in the championship game, and third overall Steinfeld Cup defeat in five years.

Long-time Rattlers assistant and 2018 Coach of the Year winner Bill Warder returned for his second season as head coach. After starting the season a league-worst 0-7, Warder and the Rattlers orchestrated a six-game win streak (four wins on the road) that had Dallas on the doorstep of the playoff picture. However, two one-goal home losses to New York and Atlanta on August 31 and September 7 officially eliminated the Rattlers. The team finished 2019 with a record of 7-9.

Transactions

Offseason
September 18, 2018 - Midfielders Ryan McNamara and Brian Kormondy agree to contract extensions.
September 21 - The Rattlers signed six players to contract extensions: Christian Carson-Banister, Jordan Dowiak, Chris Keating, Hunter Moreland, Jake Pulver, and Cody Radziewicz.
October 5 - Attackman Nate Lewnes is acquired from the Ohio Machine in exchange for a conditional draft pick.
October 15 - Defensive midfielder Joe Gillis is resigned through 2019.
October 24 - In the first supplemental draft, the Rattlers drafted ten new players in: JD Colarusso, Eli Salama, Blake Boudreau, Jack Trask, Max Gustafson, Zach Rusch, Zach Henkhaus, Danny Fowler, Nick Steinfeld, and Christian Trasolini. The Rattlers also signed undrafted free agents Kris Alleyne, Mike Diener, Wilkins Dismuke, Joe Fiorino, and Ryan Fournier.
January 21, 2019 - The Rattlers agree to trade attackman Randy Staats back to the Atlanta Blaze in exchange for third and fourth round picks in the 2019 Collegiate Draft.
April 24 - Following the suspension of the Charlotte Hounds, Florida Launch, and Ohio Machine, the Rattlers pick up eight players in the resulting dispersal draft. This includes Dallas native attackman Bryce Wasserman, who played his rookie season with Ohio in 2018.

In-season
July 2 - Midfielder Ryan Keenan is traded to the Chesapeake Bayhawks in exchange for southpaw midfielder Adam Osika.
July 19 - Shawn Evans (attack) is acquired from the Boston Cannons in exchange for a third round pick in the 2020 Collegiate Draft.
August 8 - The Rattlers trade a fifth round draft pick in the 2020 Collegiate Draft to the Bayhawks in exchange for faceoff specialist Noah Rak.

Collegiate Draft
The 2019 Collegiate Draft was held on March 9 in Charlotte, North Carolina at the NASCAR Hall of Fame. Inside Lacrosse gave the Rattlers an "A" in their team-by-team draft grades, better than every team except the Chesapeake Bayhawks.

The Rattlers announced the signing of five players on May 21: Craig Chick, Jack Jasinski, Joe Saggese, Lucas Wittenberg, and Landon Kramer.

Schedule

Standings

References

External links
 Team Website 

Major League Lacrosse seasons
Dallas Rattlers